Łukasz Romanek (21 August 1983 in Knurów, Poland – 2 June 2006 in Wilcza, Poland) was a Polish speedway rider has won Under-19 European Champion title. Romanek took his own life in June 2006.

Career

Individual World U-21 Championship 
 2001 - 9th place (7 points)
 2003 - track reserve (0 points)

Individual U-19 European Championship 
 2001 - European Champion (14 points)
 2002 - 16th place (1 point)

Individual U-21 Polish Championship 
 2003 - Polish Champion

Polish U-21 Pairs Championship 
 2003 - Polish Champion

Team Polish Championship 
 2001 - 2nd place
 2002 - 2nd place

Team U-21 Polish Championship 
 2001 - Polish Champion

Silver Helmet (U-21) 
 2004 - 3rd place
 2001 - 2nd place

See also 
 Poland speedway team
 List of Speedway Grand Prix riders
 List of suicides
 Tournament in Łukasz Romanek Memory

References 

1983 births
2006 suicides
People from Knurów
Polish speedway riders
Individual Speedway Junior European Champions
Suicides by hanging in Poland
Sportspeople from Silesian Voivodeship